Top Country Albums is a chart that ranks the top-performing country music albums in the United States, published by Billboard.  In 1975, 19 different albums topped the chart, which was at the time published under the title Top Country LP's, based on sales reports submitted by a representative sample of stores nationwide.

In the issue of Billboard dated January 4, John Denver was at number one with his album Back Home Again, its fourth week at number one.  The following week it was displaced from the top spot by Charlie Rich's album The Silver Fox.  Denver would return to number one in May with the live album An Evening with John Denver and again in December with Windsong, and was the only artist with three chart-topping albums in 1975.  Rich and Freddy Fender each achieved two number ones, as did Conway Twitty, who topped the chart with his solo album Linda on My Mind as well as with Feelins, a collaboration with Loretta Lynn.  The two singers had a run of success with duet recordings in the early 1970s alongside their ongoing solo careers.  Fender's total of 11 weeks at number one was the most by any artist.  Olivia Newton-John achieved the year's longest unbroken run atop the chart, spending six consecutive weeks in the peak position with Have You Never Been Mellow.

In September, Waylon Jennings had his first chart-topping album with Dreaming My Dreams.  The following month, Willie Nelson topped the chart for the first time with Red Headed Stranger.  Nelson had been active as a singer and songwriter since the 1960s and several of his songs had been chart-toppers for other artists, but his own recordings had not achieved great success prior to 1975.  Despite having a sound very different to the lush country-pop prevalent at the time, Red Headed Stranger was a critical and commercial success and launched Nelson to stardom.  In 2006, CMT placed it at the top of a list of the 40 greatest albums in country music.  Jennings and Nelson were two of the mainstays of the nascent outlaw country movement, which rejected slick production values and added a rock music influence and a counterculture attitude.  The year's final Top Country LP's number one was Black Bear Road by C. W. McCall, which moved into the top spot in the issue of Billboard dated December 27.

Chart history

References

1975-related lists
1975
1975 record charts